The 2019 Indian Super Cup Final was the final match of the 2019 Indian Super Cup, the second season of the Super Cup. It was played on 13 April 2019 at the Kalinga Stadium in Bhubaneshwar, Odissa.

Match

References

External links
 Super Cup Official Website.

Super Cup (India) Finals
2018–19 in Indian football
Indian Super Cup Final